is a Japanese television personality based in South Korea.
From 2007, she regularly appeared on KBS's Global Talk Show as a representative of Japan, until the show's second season ended. She had also been a regular on Wonderful Friday, including its predecessor, Live Show: Friday Wide, since 2011 until the show ended in 2014. In 2014, she joined the reality-variety TV show, With You, with singer and television personality, Lee Sang-min and remained on the show until the first season finished. She is currently a panelist on the reality-variety show, My Neighbor, Charles, and has been since 2015.

Career
In 2010, Fujita was appointed as a PR Ambassador for the 2010 G20 Seoul summit.

Filmography

Television series

Publications
 도키나와 코코로: 후지타 사유리의 도쿄 오키나와 감성 방랑기 (2008), 
 미수다 사유리의 일본어 리얼토크 (2009), 
 눈물을 닦고: 사유리의 일상과 생각을 담은 감성 에세이 (2015),

Awards

References

External links

1979 births
Living people
Japanese television personalities
Japanese expatriates in South Korea
People from Tokyo
People from Shibuya